Verrucous lupus erythematosus  presents with non-pruritic papulonodular lesions on the arms and hands, resembling keratoacanthoma or hypertrophic lichen planus.

See also
 Lupus erythematosus

References

Cutaneous lupus erythematosus
Dermal and subcutaneous growths
Dermatology